General Keating may refer to:

Frank A. Keating (1895–1973), U.S. Army major general
Henry Sheehy Keating (1775–1847), British Army lieutenant general
James J. Keating (1895–1978), U.S. Marine Corps brigadier general
Tim Keating (soldier) (fl. 1980s–2010s), New Zealand Army lieutenant general

See also
Richard Harte Keatinge (1825–1904), British Indian Army lieutenant general